Trow was a type of cargo boat used in Great Britain.

Trow may also refer to:
 Trow (folklore), a troll-like creature from Shetland and Orkney Island folklore
 Trow (surname)
 Trow, Wisconsin, a ghost town
 Trow (Myth), a type of giant in the Myth series of video games
 The NASDAQ stock ticker for T. Rowe Price

See also
 Throw (disambiguation)